"The Rock Show" is a song by American rock band Blink-182 for the group's fourth studio album, Take Off Your Pants and Jacket (2001). It was released as the lead single from the album on May 7, 2001. The track was composed primarily by bassist Mark Hoppus about meeting a girl at a rock concert. It was inspired by the band's early days touring punk rock clubs, mainly Soma in their hometown of San Diego.

The song's creation stems from Blink-182 manager Rick DeVoe's opinion that the album lacked a catchy, "feel-good" song. Hoppus composed "The Rock Show" in response, while guitarist Tom DeLonge composed the album's second single, "First Date". The song was influenced by bands such as the Ramones, Screeching Weasel, and the Descendents.

The song peaked at number two on Billboard Modern Rock Tracks chart, making it the most successful single from the album. It also reached number 14 in the United Kingdom. The song's music video finds the band given an unusually large budget for the video, and spending frivolously on random things. In promotion of the single, Blink-182 performed the song live on late-night talk show Late Show with David Letterman.

Background
Prior to recording the group's fourth studio album, Take Off Your Pants and Jacket, Blink-182 recorded demos at DML Studios, a small practice studio in Escondido, California, where the band had written Dude Ranch and Enema of the State. The group had written a dozen songs after three weeks and invited the band's manager, Rick DeVoe, to be the first person outside Blink-182 to hear the new material, which the band found "catchy [but with] a definitive edge". DeVoe sat in the control room and quietly listened to the recordings, and pressed the band at the end on why there was no "Blink-182 good-time summer anthem [thing]". DeLonge and Hoppus were furious, remarking, "You want a fucking single? I'll write you the cheesiest, catchiest, throwaway fucking summertime single you've ever heard!" Hoppus went home and wrote "The Rock Show" in ten minutes, and DeLonge similarly wrote "First Date", which became the most successful singles from the record and future live staples.

Hoppus wrote the song based on his memories of the San Diego club Soma. In their early days, Blink-182 performed dozens of concerts at the venue, mainly at the 5305 Metro Street location. "It was covered with graffiti, it stunk, it was made of concrete and metal so the sound sucked and the toilets were always over-flowing. It was the best, we loved it," he recalled. Barker remembered that the song's arrangement was worked in the Famous Stars and Straps warehouse in San Diego. The band felt the song captured "the spirit of the Ramones and Screeching Weasel," and "[it was] definitely influenced by bands like the Descendents." The band members expanded upon this in a 2001 interview with BBC Music:

Although it only peaked at number 71 on the Billboard Hot 100 and number 33 on the Mainstream Top 40 chart, it reached number two on Billboard Modern Rock Tracks chart.

Reception
Eric Aiese of Billboard examined the song through the lens of its airplay competition: "As the face of rock radio has yielded toward the emerging hard sounds on "nu metal," Blink continues to provide a contrasting voice […] "The Rock Show" clearly shows the band's talent for writing—and performing—hooks."

Music video
The band filmed a music video that included them trashing televisions, trains, taking the homeless for a spa makeover, handing out cash to strangers and paying dancers to mow people's lawns. The relatively large budget for the video, reportedly $500,000, was the basis of the joke and frivolously spent.

Track listing

Charts and certifications

Weekly charts

Year-end charts

Certifications

Release history

In popular culture
 During the hiatus, Mark Hoppus and Travis Barker regularly played this song in their band, +44. Craig Fairbaugh, guitarist and background vocalist of +44, replaced DeLonge on backing vocals.
 "The Rock Show" appears in the video games Amplitude, Guitar Hero 5, Guitar Hero Live, and Splashdown.
 The song is available as DLC for both Rock Band and its portable counterpart, Rock Band Unplugged.

References

2001 singles
2001 songs
Blink-182 songs
MCA Records singles
Music videos directed by The Malloys
Songs written by Mark Hoppus
Songs written by Tom DeLonge
Songs written by Travis Barker